Cayuga High School is a public high school located in Cayuga, Texas. It is part of the Cayuga Independent School District located in northwestern Anderson County and classified as a 2A school by the UIL. In 2013, the school was rated "Met Standard" by the Texas Education Agency.

Athletics
The Cayuga Wildcats compete in the following sports 

Baseball
Basketball
Cross Country
Football
Golf
Softball
Tennis
Track and Field
Volleyball

State Titles
Boys Basketball 
1951(1A), 1953(1A), 1954(1A), 2010(1A/D1)
Football 
2009(1A/D2)
Girls Track 
1985(1A), 1986(1A)

Rivals
Cross RoadsLa PoynorKerens

2010 State Champions (Basketball)

Season Info
Record 22-2
11 100-point games
10 consecutive 100-point games
6 Seniors
89.6 PPG

Coaches:
Head Coach: Greg Jenkins
Assistant Coaches: Russell Holden, Carl Ivins, Greg Branch

Patrick Boxie #0
Billy Duncan #1
Sha’keal Jenkins #2
D’onte Jackson #3
Malcome Kennedy #4
Chris Turner #5
Hunter Jenkins #10
Traylon Shead #15
Josiah Summerville #20
Preston Anderson #21
CJ Wagner #22
Caleb Summerville #23
Don Holly #32
Dalevin Campbell #33
Zac Bowman #44
Melvin Shead #52
Deon Shofner #55

Traylon Shead
Traylon Shead (graduate of 2010) committed to play running back at the University of Texas. Shead is the all-time touchdown leader in Texas High School Football History. Shead is also number 2 in rushing yards behind "The Sugarland Express" Kenneth Hall

References

External links
 Cayuga ISD

Schools in Anderson County, Texas
Public high schools in Texas